Claudia La Gatta, (born October 9, 1979) is a Venezuelan actress and model. Best known for participating in telenovelas from Venezuela.

Personal life 
She is married to the actor Luis Gerónimo Abreu from 2010. In 2015 was born their first child next to Luis Gerónimo called Salvador Abreu.

Filmography

Films

Television

References

External links 

1979 births
Venezuelan telenovela actresses
Venezuelan female models
21st-century Venezuelan actresses
Venezuelan film actresses
Actresses from Caracas
Living people